Désert may refer to:

 "Désert" (Émilie Simon song), 2002
 Désert (novel), a 1980 novel by J. M. G. Le Clézio
 Le désert, an 1844 "ode-symphonie" by Félicien David with words by Auguste Colin
 Le Désert, a former commune in Calvados department, France

People
 Alex Désert (born 1968), American actor and musician
 Claire Désert (born 1967), French classical pianist
 Solen Désert-Mariller (born 1982), French Olympic sprinter

See also
 Desert (disambiguation)